Operation Vendetta may refer to:

 A subsidiary plan of the 1944 Operation Zeppelin (deception plan)
 Part of the Battle of Long Tan